Magoksa is a head temple of the Jogye Order of Korean Buddhism in Gongju, South Korea.  It is located on the eastern slope of Taehwasan, on taegeuk-shaped bend in the Taegeukcheon Stream.

History 
Magoksa Temple (Korean: 마곡사, Chinese: 麻谷寺, Pronounced “Ma-gok-sa”) was established in 640 by Vinaya Master Jajang Yulsa, who also built Tongdosa Temple upon his return from China. Silla's Queen Seondeok then gave him 200 gyeol (an ancient measurement of land estimated at about 6,800 square meters) of land on which he built a brick pagoda and Magoksa Temple. The name “Magoksa” (literally “Hemp Valley Temple”) originated with Ven. Bocheol Hwasang,  a monk who lived there later, because the way many people gathered to listen to his Dharma talks reminded him of hemp stalks closely packed together.

Magoksa Temple was closed during the turbulent transition period between the Goryeo Dynasty and the Joseon Dynasty. From then on the temple became a hideout for thieves for about 200 years. Finally, in 1172, Ven. Jinul (also Chinul or Bojo Guksa) drove out the thieves and renovated the temple with the help of his disciple Ven. Su-u. Joseon's King Sejo visited the temple and personally wrote the plaque for Yeongsanjeon Hall.  The king also left behind the palanquin he rode in on his trip to Magoksa Temple.

During the Japanese invasion (1592-1597), most of the temple's buildings were burned down. In 1651 some buildings, Daeungjeon, Yeongsanjeon and Daejeok-gwangjeon, were reconstructed. During the period of the Korean Empire (1897-1910), Kim Gu (金九, pen name: Baekbeom) came to Magoksa Temple after escaping from Incheon Prison, and temporarily lived a monastic life under the Dharma name Wonjong. Kim Gu had been imprisoned after killing a Japanese military officer who had conspired with the murderers of Empress Myeongseong. The juniper tree growing in front of Daegwang-bojeon Hall is said to have been planted by Kim Gu himself.

Legend

Legend tells us that when Jajang came to the eastern slope of Taehwasan where Magoksa is found he decided to establish a temple and call it magok, which means Flax Valley.  Jajang felt that many good priests could come from the area "to cause the rapid growth of Buddhism", like the rapid growth of the flax plant that grows here.

Cultural Properties 
According to geomantic theory, the terrain of the mountains and rivers around Magoksa forms the “taegeuk” design and so it was selected as one of Joseon's ten utopian sites,  places safe from war and disaster, by geomancy books like Taengniji (Guide for Choosing Desirable Settlement-sites) and Jeonggamnok (The Prophetic Writings of Jeong). That may be why Magoksa Temple has many timeless pieces of cultural heritage. One must first appreciate the calligraphy of the name plaques that deck the Dharma halls, which can easily be missed.

First is the calligraphy on the plaque of Daeung-bojeon,  the Main Buddha Hall. Written by Kim Saeng, one of the four great calligraphers of Silla and Goryeo, the characters display the energy and talent of the writer. Next is the plaque of Yeongsanjeon which has “Sejo-daewang-eopil (世祖大王御筆),” meaning “Written by King Sejo” in the upper left hand corner. It may have been written when the king stopped by Magoksa on his way to Onyang or Mt. Songnisan. Another is the plaque of Daegwang-bojeon, written by Gang Se-hwang  who excelled in literature, art and calligraphy, and taught such disciples as Sin Wi and Kim Hong-do.

Then there is the plaque of Simgeomdang written by Jo Yun-hyeong,  an honorable government official during the reign of King Jeongjo. The plaque reading “Magoksa” that hangs on the dormitory was created by Kim Gyu-jin,  an artist of the modern era, by adding a simple painting around the writing.

 Treasure #799 - Magoksa houses a five-storey, Ocheung Stone pagoda.  The pagoda is one of only three in the world the top embellished with bronze, suggesting influence from Tibetan (Lama) Buddhism.
 Treasure #800 - Yeongsanjeon
 Treasure #801 - Daeungbojeon
 Treasure #802 - Daegwangbojeon
 Treasure #1260 - Gaebultaeng of Buddha, a woodblock print from the 13th year (1687) of King Sukjong, in color on hemp cloth.

Cultural Properties and Two Stories 
In total, Magoksa Temple has 18 cultural properties: five state-designated; seven “city/province-designated”; one “folklore”; and five “cultural heritage.” King Sejo's palanquin, “folklore heritage,” has a story associated with it. When the king came to Magoksa Temple to meet Kim Si-seup (pen name: Maewoldang) and found that he had gone, he left his palanquin at the temple and returned to the palace riding an ox, saying, “Kim Si-seup has deserted me, so I can’t ride the palanquin.”

On the floor of Daegwang-bojeon is a mat woven from tree bark. It covers an area of 99 square meters (1,067 square feet), and this is its story. In the late Joseon era, a crippled man came to Magoksa Temple and offered prayers for 100 days. During that time, whenever he could, he wove this floor mat. After his 100 days of prayer, he left the Dharma hall walking on his own two feet.

gallery

Tourism  
It also offers temple stay programs where visitors can experience Buddhist culture.

See also
Korean Buddhist temples
Korean Buddhism
Religion in South Korea
Korean architecture

References

External links
Official website
KoreaTemple profile
Visit Korea profile

Buddhist temples in South Korea
Buddhist temples of the Jogye Order
Gongju
Buildings and structures in South Chungcheong Province
Tourist attractions in South Chungcheong Province
World Heritage Sites in South Korea